is a railway station in the city of  Shinshiro, Aichi Prefecture, Japan, operated by Central Japan Railway Company (JR Tōkai).

Lines
Mikawa-Makihara Station is served by the Iida Line, and is located 40.6 kilometers from the starting point of the line at Toyohashi Station.

Station layout
The station has a single island platform connected to the station building by a level crossing. The station building has automated ticket machines, TOICA automated turnstiles and is unattended.

Platforms

Adjacent stations

|-
!colspan=5|Central Japan Railway Company

Station history
Mikawa-Makihara Station was established on February 1, 1923 as a station on the now-defunct . On August 1, 1943, The Horaiji Railway and the Sanshin Railway were nationalized along with some other local lines to form the Japanese Government Railways (JGR) Iida Line. Scheduled freight operations were discontinued in 1971. The station has been unattended since 1984. Along with its division and privatization of JNR on April 1, 1987, the station came under the control and operation of the Central Japan Railway Company.

Surrounding area
The station is located in an isolated rural area.

See also
 List of Railway Stations in Japan

References

External links

Railway stations in Japan opened in 1923
Railway stations in Aichi Prefecture
Iida Line
Stations of Central Japan Railway Company
Shinshiro, Aichi